The 2004–05 Oklahoma State Cowboys basketball team represented Oklahoma State University as a member of the Big 12 Conference during the 2004–05 NCAA Division I men's basketball season. The team was led by 15th-year head coach Eddie Sutton and played their home games at Gallagher-Iba Arena. The Cowboys followed the previous season’s Final Four appearance by finishing with a record of 27–6 (11–5 Big 12) and a No. 8 final ranking in each of the two major polls.

After winning the Big 12 tournament, Oklahoma State received an automatic bid to the NCAA tournament as No. 2 seed in the Chicago region. After defeating Southeastern Louisiana in the opening round, the Cowboys defeated No. 7 seed Southern Illinois to reach the Sweet Sixteen. The run ended in the regional semifinal, as Arizona defeated OSU 79–78. It would end up being Coach Sutton’s final Tournament appearance.

Roster

Source:

Schedule and results

|-
!colspan=9 style=| Regular season

|-
!colspan=9 style=| Big 12 Tournament

|-
!colspan=9 style=| NCAA tournament

Rankings

Awards and honors
Joey Graham – Third-Team All-American (AP)
John Lucas III – Honorable Mention All-American (AP)

NBA draft

References

Oklahoma State Cowboys basketball seasons
Oklahoma State
2004 in sports in Oklahoma
2005 in sports in Oklahoma
Oklahoma State